Cromdale (from crom 'crooked' and dal 'valley, dale') is a village in  Strathspey, in the Highland council area of Scotland, and one of the ancient parishes which formed the combined ecclesiastical (later civil) parish of Cromdale, Inverallan and Advie in Morayshire.

The village was within Inverness-shire until 1869, when it was moved by the Inverness and Elgin County Boundaries Act 1870 to the Morayshire. It remained part of Morayshire until 1975, when the county was divided between the Highland and Grampian regions; it is now within the Highland Council Area. The village retained Morayshire as its official postal address for many years after the change in local government boundaries.

The parish church and cemetery are located beside the River Spey at the end of Kirk Road beside the bridge which is the latest of three which replaced the nearby ferry. The bridge was financed by local residents, having been obtained as a War Surplus item from the War Office and erected in 1922 at a cost of £6,889. The remains of an older bridge can be seen a short distance upstream; this (much lighter) bridge was swept away in 1894, the 1922 bridge replaced one that collapsed in 1921.

About halfway along Kirk Road is Cromdale railway station, which closed in the 1960s but survives in private hands along with some preserved railway paraphernalia. It lies on the route of the now closed Great North of Scotland Railway line from Boat of Garten to Craigellachie.

To the south of Cromdale is Balmenach Distillery, which was served by a branch line running from Cromdale station that passed under the main road alongside Cromdale Burn. This distillery has had a chequered history in recent years but is again in production.

The old school had become the Cromdale Outdoor Education Centre and stands opposite the Haugh Hotel.

The village is within the Cairngorms National Park.

Football 
Cromdale has two teams, Spey Valley United, who compete in the Scottish Junior Football North Division One (West). The other team is Cromdale F.C., who compete in the local Strathspey & Badenoch Welfare FA league. Both clubs use Cromdale's public football ground for all home matches.

Historical references 
Censuses
In various census and/or derived records the description of Cromdale has been used to describe the entire civil parish of Cromdale, Inverallan and Advie thus often causing an apparent mismatch between different censuses. In the 1841, 1851 and 1861 censuses it will be necessary to determine the actual locality from the descriptions on the census book pages or by the names of known locations. From 1871 onward, a record marked as being within parish number 128/2, 128B/2 or 128B2 will not be in Cromdale but in Inverallan (which contains Grantown); Advie was always enumerated with Cromdale thus requiring the relevant parish to be identified from the address or description.

Birth, marriage and death registrations
In 1855 one registration district (Cromdale, Inverallan and Advie) included all the combined parishes. From 1856 to 1965 the local registration district was Cromdale and Advie. From 1966 Cromdale has been within the Grantown on Spey registration district. The LDS church and other third parties have failed to distinguish the 1856 separation of records in their indexes thus their descriptions of the registration districts do not match the official descriptions.

References

External links
 

Populated places in Badenoch and Strathspey
Former church parishes of Scotland